The Ink Flag (Degel HaDyo) was a handmade Israeli flag raised in March 1949 during the 1948 Arab–Israeli War to mark the capture of Umm Rashrash.  The flag’s display in what later became Eilat however, was short lived; It was replaced two hours later by an official flag when the Golani Brigade arrived.

History
On 5 March 1949, Israel launched Operation Uvda, the last military maneuver of the 1948 Arab–Israeli War. On 10 March, the Israeli Defense Forces reached the shores of the Red Sea at Umm Rashrash, west of Aqaba in the area of biblical Elath, and captured it without a battle. The Negev Brigade and Golani Brigade took part in the operation. A makeshift flag created from a white sheet inscribed with ink was raised by Captain (later General) Avraham Adan, company commander of the 8th Battalion of the Negev Brigade.

The improvised flag was made on the order of Negev Brigade commander Nahum Sarig, when it was discovered that the brigade did not have an Israeli flag on hand. The soldiers found a sheet, drew two ink stripes, and sewed on a Star of David torn off a first-aid kit.

In Eilat, a bronze sculpture by Israeli sculptor Bernard Reder commemorates the event. The photo of the raising of the Ink Flag, taken by the soldier Micha Perry, bears resemblance to the 1945 American photo Raising the Flag on Iwo Jima.

Gallery

References

External links

Prime Minister Ariel Sharon’s Speech on Eilat Day - 56 Years Since the Raising of the Ink Flag, March 20th, 2005

1948 Arab–Israeli War
1949 in Israel
History of Eilat
Historical flags
Black-and-white photographs
Special events flags
War photographs
Flags in art
1949 in art
1949 photographs
Flags of Israel
Flags introduced in 1949
Inks